Oleksandr Mashnin (born 20 March 1990 in Mykolaiv, Ukraine) is a professional Ukrainian football midfielder who plays for Real Pharma Odesa.

Career
Mashnin is a product of the SK Real Odesa youth sportive school.

He spent his career in the Ukrainian football clubs from lower Leagues and in February 2017 he signed a contract with the Ukrainian Premier League FC Chornomorets. He made his debut for Chornomorets Odesa in the Ukrainian Premier League in a match against FC Shakhtar Donetsk on 9 April 2017.

References

External links
Statistics at FFU website (Ukr)

1990 births
Living people
Sportspeople from Mykolaiv
Ukrainian footballers
Ukrainian expatriate footballers
Expatriate footballers in Poland
Ukrainian expatriate sportspeople in Poland
SC Odesa players
FC Real Pharma Odesa players
Ukrainian Premier League players
FC Zhemchuzhyna Odesa players
FC Chornomorets Odesa players
OKS Stomil Olsztyn players

Association football midfielders